Proof of Life is a 2000 American action thriller film directed and produced by Taylor Hackford. The title refers to a phrase commonly used to indicate proof that a kidnap victim is still alive.  The film's screenplay was written by Tony Gilroy, who also was an executive producer, and was inspired by William Prochnau's Vanity Fair magazine article "Adventures in the Ransom Trade", and Thomas Hargrove's book Long March to Freedom, in which Hargrove recounts how his release was negotiated by Thomas Clayton, who went on to be the founder of kidnap-for-ransom consultancy Clayton Consultants, Inc.

The film stars Meg Ryan and Russell Crowe.

Plot
Alice Bowman moves to the (fictional) South American country of Tecala because her engineer husband, Peter Bowman, has been hired to help build a new dam for oil company Quad Carbon. While driving one morning through the city, Peter is caught in traffic and then ambushed and abducted by guerrilla rebels of the Liberation Army of Tecala (ELT). Believing that Peter is working on Quad Carbon's oil pipeline, ELT soldiers lead him through the jungle.

Terry Thorne, a former member of the British Special Air Service, arrives in Tecala fresh from a successful hostage rescue in Chechnya. As an expert negotiator in kidnapping-and-ransom cases, he is assigned by his company, Luthan Risk, to bargain for Peter's safe return. Unfortunately, it is learned that Quad Carbon is on the verge of bankruptcy and takeover, and therefore has no insurance coverage for kidnapping, so they cannot afford Thorne's services. Despite Alice's pleas to stay, Thorne leaves the country. Alice is then assigned a corrupt local hostage negotiator, who immediately urges her to pay the ELT's first ransom demand: a $50,000 "good faith" payment. Not knowing what to do, Alice agrees, but the transaction is stopped by Thorne who (due to his conscience) has returned to help. He is aided by Dino, a competing negotiator and ex–Green Beret.

Over the next few months, Thorne uses a radio to speak with an ELT contact, and the two argue over terms for Peter's release—including a ransom payment that Alice can afford. Thorne and Alice bond through the ordeal, and become intimate. They eventually negotiate a sum of $650,000.

Meanwhile, Peter has become a prisoner at the ELT's jungle base camp. There, he befriends another hostage named Kessler —a missionary and former member of the French Foreign Legion—who has lived in the camp for nineteen months. The two concoct an escape plan, but during their attempt they are quickly tracked by the ELT. Kessler falls into a river after being shot in the shoulder and manages to escape, but Peter steps on a trap and is recaptured. Kessler is found and hospitalized. Thorne's ELT contact subsequently refuses to respond to his calls. Luckily, one of Alice's young maids recognizes his voice over the radio and reveals he is a government official. Thorne confronts the contact, who confirms that Peter is alive, but because of the ELT's escalating war with the government and Peter's knowledge of the terrain, the ELT will no longer negotiate.

At Thorne's urging, Alice and Kessler convince the Tecala government that the ELT is mounting an attack on the pipeline being built through their territory. This forces the government army to mobilize, thus forcing a bulk of the camp's ELT troops to mobilize for a counter-attack. Thorne, Dino, and several associates are then inserted by helicopter and raid the weakened ELT base. They overcome the camp's soldiers, free Peter and another hostage, and then fly back to the city, where Alice happily reunites with her husband. Thorne and Alice share a final intimate moment before the latter departs with Peter on an immediate flight to the U.S.

Cast

 Meg Ryan as Alice Bowman
 Russell Crowe as Terry Thorne
 David Morse as Peter Bowman
 Pamela Reed as Janis Goodman
 David Caruso as Dino
 Anthony Heald as Ted Fellner
 Michael Byrne as Lord Luthan
 Stanley Anderson as Jerry
 Gottfried John as Eric Kessler
 Alun Armstrong as Wyatt
 Michael Kitchen as Ian Havery
 Margo Martindale as Ivy
 Mario Ernesto Sánchez as Arturo Fernandez
 Pietro Sibille as Juaco
 Vicky Hernández as Maria
 Norma Martínez as Norma
 Carlos Blanchard as Carlos 
 Rowena King as Pamela 
 Diego Trujillo as Eliodoro
 Roberto Frisone as Calitri
 Gerard Naprous as Pierre LeNoir
 Merlin Hanbury-Tenison as Henry Thorne
 Aleksandr Baluev as Russian Colonel
 Said K. Saralijen as Chechen Rebel Leader
 Claudia Dammert as Ginger
 Tony Vazquez as Dr. Frederico De Carnedas / Marco
 Aristoteles Picho as Sandro
 Sarahi Echeverria as Cinta
 Raul Rodríguez as Tomas
 Mauro Cueva as Rico
 Alejandro Cordova as 'Rambo'
 Sandro Bellido as Mono
 Jaime Zevallos as Nino
 Gilberto Torres as Raymo
 Flora Martinez as Linda
 Laura Escobar as Cara
 Marco Bustos as Alex
 Jorge Medina as Berto

Background
Although the producers wanted to film in Colombia, due to the dangers that guerrillas posed in that country at the time, the movie was mainly filmed in Ecuador. Tecala's geographic and urban appearance and its political characteristics were based loosely on a mix of several Andean countries.

The ELT's characterization appears to be primarily based on the Revolutionary Armed Forces of Colombia (FARC).  Coincidentally, Colombia's second largest guerrilla group is the Ejército de Liberación Nacional or ELN.

Control Risks, a risk consulting firm, was hired to provide security for the cast and crew while filming on location. The firm also provided contacts for character inspiration for the kidnap and ransom consulting seen in the film.

The movie end credit and post-script says: "Inspired by the VANITY FAIR article 'Adventures in the Ransom Trade' by William Prochnau and by the book Long March to Freedom by Thomas Hargrove.

Tecala
The Republic of Tecala, where most of Proof of Life is set, is a fictional South American country. Tecala has long been the scene of an internal conflict between its government forces and the Liberation Army of Tecala (ELT). The ELT was originally a Marxist guerrilla group supported by the Soviet Union, but after the Soviet Union's dissolution in 1991, the ELT's primary source of funding fell through, and they began kidnapping people for ransom to fund their operations. A map seen in the film is that of Ecuador. The country's capital Quito was chosen along with the eastern jungle and the nearby city of Baños de Agua Santa in the Ecuadorian Andes.

Release 

The film opened in wide release in the United States on December 8, 2000 for 2,705 screens. The opening weekend's gross was $10,207,869 and the total receipts for the U.S. run were $32,598,931. The international box-office receipts were $30,162,074, for total receipts of $62,761,005. The film was in wide release in the U.S. for twelve weeks (eighty days). In its widest release, the film was featured in 2,705 theaters across the country.

Soundtrack
The score was by Danny Elfman. Several songs were written by Christian Valencia. The song, "I'll Be Your Lover, Too," written and performed by Van Morrison, plays over the closing credits. The soundtrack was released on Varèse Sarabande.

Death during filming
The film is dedicated to Will Gaffney, David Morse's stand-in who was killed on-set when a truck he was in went over a cliff. Morse was away at the time because of a family illness.

Home media
The film was released on DVD on June 19, 2001.

Reception

Critical response
Stephen Holden, film critic for The New York Times, did not think the film worked well and opined that the actors did not connect. He wrote, "[the film displays] a gaping lack of emotional connection among the characters in a romantic triangle that feels conspicuously unromantic ... what ultimately sinks this stylish but heartless film is a flat lead performance by the eternally snippy Meg Ryan ... Ms. Ryan expresses no inner conflict, nor much of anything else beyond a mounting tension. Even when her wide blue eyes well up with tears, the pain she conveys is more the frustration of a little girl who has misplaced her doll than any deep, empathetic suffering."

Critic David Ansen gave the film a mixed review, writing,

Taylor Hackford's thriller Proof of Life leaves a lot to be desired, but it's got its hands on a fascinating subject ... To be fair, Tony Gilroy's screenplay keeps the romance on the back burner ... Thorne is the most compelling aspect of Proof of Life, thanks to Crowe's quiet, hard-bitten charisma. It's a part Bogart once would have played—the amoral tough guy who rises to the moral occasion—and Crowe gives it just the right note of gravel-voiced masculinity. But neither Crowe, Ryan nor the topical subject keeps Proof of Life from feeling recycled. For all the up-to-the-minute research, the movie still gives off the musty scent of Hollywood contrivance.

Review aggregator Rotten Tomatoes gives the film an approval rating of 39% based on 117 reviews; the average rating is 5.3/10.  The consensus is: "Despite its promising premise and superstar cast, Proof of Life is just a routine thriller that doesn't offer anything new."

Awards

The film was nominated for four Blockbuster Entertainment Awards; Favorite Actor – Suspense, Favorite Actress - Suspense, Favorite Supporting Actor – Suspense and Favorite Supporting Actress – Suspense. Danny Elfman was also nominated for a Satellite Award for Best Original Score at the 5th Golden Satellite Awards, but lost out to Gladiator (Hans Zimmer).

See also
 Colombian armed conflict
 Kidnappings in Colombia

References

External links
 
 
 
 

2000 films
2000 action thriller films
American action thriller films
American films based on actual events
American political thriller films
Castle Rock Entertainment films
Films about kidnapping
Films based on newspaper and magazine articles
Films based on multiple works
Films based on non-fiction books
Films set in Colombia
Ecuador
Films set in a fictional country
Films shot in Ecuador
Films shot at Pinewood Studios
Films directed by Taylor Hackford
Films scored by Danny Elfman
Films with screenplays by Tony Gilroy
Warner Bros. films
2000s English-language films
2000s American films